Gaye Teede (born 15 April 1946), also known as Gaye Switch or Gaye Walsh, is a former Australia netball international and a former Australia head coach. As a player, she represented Australia at the 1967, 1971 and 1979 World Netball Championships, winning one silver and two gold medals. She captained Australia as they won the gold medal in 1971 and was subsequently named the Western Australian Sports Star of the Year. She was head coach when the Australia U21 team won the 1988 World Youth Netball Championships. In 1990, Teede coached the senior Australia team for  five tests. Between 1990 and 1998 Teede served as head coach at the Australian Institute of Sport. In 1989 she was inducted into the Western Australian Hall of Champions and in 2009 she was inducted into the Australian Netball Hall of Fame.

Playing career

Western Australia
In 1961, as Gaye Switch, Teede represented Western Australia at under-16 level. In 1963 she made her debut for the senior Western Australia team. In 1969, in Adelaide, she was a member the senior Western Australia team that won the Australian National Netball Championships outright for the first time.

Australia
Between 1966 and 1978 Teede made 17 test appearances for Australia. She represented Australia at the 1967 and 1971 World Netball Championships, winning silver and gold respectively. She also captained Australia at the latter tournament and was subsequently  named the Western Australian Sports Star of the Year. Teede then took a seven year break from international netball to start a family. On her return she represented Australia at the 1979 World Netball Championships, serving as vice captain. The tournament saw Australia, New Zealand and Trinidad and Tobago declared joint winners. A serious knee injury at the 1979 tournament ended Teede's playing career.

Coaching career

Australian Institute of Sport
Between 1982 and 1990 Teede served as an assistant coach to Wilma Shakespear at the  Australian Institute of Sport. In 1990 she replaced Shakespear as the program's head coach and remained in the position until 1998.

Australia
Between 1986 and 1988, Teede served as head coach of the Australia U21 team. She was head coach when Australia won the 1988 World Youth Netball Championships. In 1990, Teede coached the senior Australia team in five Tests   with an 80% winning record.

Perth Orioles
Between 1999 and 2002, Teede served as head coach of Perth Orioles in the Commonwealth Bank Trophy.

Honours

Player
Australia
World Netball Championships
Winners: 1971, 1979
Runners up: 1967
Western Australia
Australian National Netball Championships
Winners: 1969

Individual
Western Australian Sports Star of the Year
Winner: 1971
Western Australian Hall of Champions
Winner: 1989 
Australian Netball Hall of Fame
Inducted: 2009

Head coach
Australia U21
World Youth Netball Championships
Winners: 1988

References

Living people
1946 births
Australian netball players
Australia international netball players
Australian netball coaches
Australia national netball team coaches
Australian Institute of Sport netball coaches
Western Australian Sports Star of the Year winners
Netball players from Western Australia
Commonwealth Bank Trophy coaches
Sportspeople from Perth, Western Australia
Perth Orioles
Esso/Mobil Superleague coaches
1967 World Netball Championships players
1971 World Netball Championships players
1979 World Netball Championships players